Damias rotunda is a moth of the family Erebidae first described by George Hampson in 1900. It is found on the Louisiade Archipelago in Papua New Guinea.

References

Damias
Moths described in 1900